Rugby union in Rotuma is a major sport. Rotuma is a dependency of Fiji, although one with a distinctive culture and language, more related to its neighbours in Tonga and Samoa.

The Fiji Rugby Football Union is the governing body of rugby union in Rotuma.

History
Rugby was introduced to Rotuma at the turn of the 20th century, by sailors, and New Zealand missionaries.

In 1910, a combined America Universities rugby team comprising mostly players from California, Stanford, and the University of Nevada went on a tour of Australia and New Zealand, as well as Fiji and Rotuma. The underdog American side upset both Rotorua RFC and Auckland RU, which came as a great surprise to the international rugby community.

Rugby Sevens has been a sport in the South Pacific Games since the late 1990s.

See also
Jono Gibbes (maternal side), a New Zealand rugby union player.
Graham Dewes, former Fiji rugby union player.
 NRL player John Sutton.
 Gabriel Penjueli
 Maka Kafoa
 Freddy Kafoa
 Chloe Butler
Rebecca Tavo
Nigel Simpson
Rocky Khan
Ravai Fatiaki, a Fiji rugby union player.
Sarafu Fatiaki, former NRL player for the Penrith Panthers.
Lee Roy Atalifo

External links
 http://www.rotuma.net/os/sports/sports2009/sports0901.htm
 DOI.org
 http://www.rotumabrisbane.com/

References

 
Sport in Rotuma